Rhagoletis zoqui is a species of tephritid or fruit fly in the genus Rhagoletis of the family Tephritidae.

References

zoqui
Insects described in 1966